Now Deh (also Romanized as Nowdeh) is a village in Ebrahimabad Rural District, Ramand District, Buin Zahra County, Qazvin Province, Iran. At the 2006 census, its population was 457, in 134 families.

References 

Populated places in Buin Zahra County